There are more than 30 current and former places of worship in the borough of Gosport in Hampshire, England.  Various Christian denominations and groups use 27 churches, chapels and halls for worship and other activities, and a further four buildings no longer serve a religious function but survive in alternative uses.  Gosport is one of 13 local government districts in the county of Hampshire—a large county in central southern England, with a densely populated coastal fringe facing the English Channel and a more rural hinterland.  The borough occupies a peninsula in the south of the county, facing the city of Portsmouth across Portsmouth Harbour, and is largely urban.  The town of Gosport expanded in the 19th century to take over previously separate villages such as Brockhurst, Elson, Forton and Alverstoke, which were all outside the extensive defences set up two centuries earlier.  Further growth in the 20th century led to the construction of the vast Bridgemary and Rowner housing estates.  Old parish churches existed at Alverstoke and Rowner, and survive in much-altered form.  These were supplemented by others built mostly in the Victorian era; and a range of churches and chapels for other denominations are also located throughout the borough, mostly dating from the past 150 years.  Lee-on-the-Solent, a separate village and seaside resort, is also in the borough and has several places of worship of its own.

The 2011 United Kingdom census reported that the majority of Gosport's residents are Christian, and there are no places of worship in the borough for followers of other faiths. The Church of England—the country's Established Church—is represented by the largest number of church buildings, the oldest of which dates from the 12th century; but a wide variety of other denominations have their own places of worship, some of which can trace their history back to the 18th century when Gosport was becoming established as an important port and centre for Royal Navy.  Roman Catholics have worshipped in the town since 1750, predating by several decades the first church in the much larger city of Portsmouth; the first Baptist chapel opened in 1811; several chapels were provided in the 19th century for followers of the Wesleyan branch of Methodism; and a Congregational chapel of 1794 was one of the forerunners of the present Gosport United Reformed Church.  Other groups represented in the borough include Evangelical Christians, The Salvation Army and Jehovah's Witnesses.

Historic England has awarded listed status to six places of worship in Gosport.  A building is defined as "listed" when it is placed on a statutory register of buildings of "special architectural or historic interest" in accordance with the Planning (Listed Buildings and Conservation Areas) Act 1990. The Department for Digital, Culture, Media and Sport, a Government department, is responsible for this; Historic England, a non-departmental public body, acts as an agency of the department to administer the process and advise the department on relevant issues. There are three grades of listing status. Grade I, the highest, is defined as being of "exceptional interest"; Grade II* is used for "particularly important buildings of more than special interest"; and Grade II, the lowest, is used for buildings of "special interest".  Gosport Borough Council also grants locally listed status to buildings of local architectural or historic interest which are not on the statutory register; two places of worship have this status.

Overview of the borough and its places of worship

It has a coastline along The Solent at Spithead and a land border with the Borough of Fareham to the north. The main settlement is Gosport town, which has merged with the ancient villages of Alverstoke and Rowner (each with their own parish church) and other settlements such as Elson, Forton and Brockhurst. Bridgemary, to the northwest near Fareham, is mostly a postwar housing estate, a "vast sprawl" in the north of Rowner parish. In the southwest corner of the borough is the small seaside resort of Lee-on-the-Solent. The land covered by the borough of Gosport was divided between the medieval liberty of Alverstoke, which covered the ancient manor and village of Alverstoke and Gosport town itself, and the hundred of Titchfield. The parishes of Titchfield (which included Lee-on-the-Solent) and Rowner were part of this hundred.

Gosport town was not documented until the 13th century, when "the manor of Alverstoke with Gosport" was transferred from the possession of St Swithun's Priory at Winchester to the Bishop of Winchester.  Founded in 1204, according to tradition, it was a small-scale medieval planned settlement similar to Portsmouth and Southampton. There is now little evidence of these origins other than the street patterns around Gosport High Street.  The parish church of the whole medieval borough, St Mary's at Alverstoke, does not appear in the Domesday Book but was documented in 1124; structurally, nothing survives of its 12th-century origins.  Only in 1696, by which time Gosport's proximity to Portsmouth had increased its importance as an industrial and port town, was an Anglican church (Holy Trinity) provided in the town centre.  The rapid growth of the town in the 19th century prompted the construction of more Anglican churches at Forton (1831; rebuilt to a larger size 1892–1906), Elson (1845), the northern part of the town centre around Clarence Road (1845–46), the New Town area around Stoke Road (1865) and Leesland (1890), all of which remain in use except St Matthew's at Clarence Road—demolished in the mid-20th century.  The postwar housing estates at Bridgemary and Rowner also required Anglican churches; Rowner already had one, the tiny 12th-century St Mary the Virgin, but it was greatly extended in 1965 (rebuilt 1992 after fire damage), while a new church was built at Bridgemary in the 1950s.  At Lee-on-the-Solent, a tin tabernacle served the Anglican population from the 1880s until the present St Faith's Church was completed in 1933.

Gosport's Roman Catholic mission was founded in 1750, before the Papists Act 1778 relieved Catholic worshippers of the penal laws which applied to them.  It was founded by and served from Havant, "one of five ancient centres of Catholicism in Hampshire".  With no railway or ferry available then, Havant's priest—"an intrepid horseman"— travelled round the top of Portsmouth Harbour, through Cosham, Portchester and Fareham, to reach Gosport.  The first chapel also served Portsmouth's Catholics until 1791; in contrast, they crossed Portsmouth Harbour in rowing boats.  Later, a wealthy Portsmouth resident put forward money to support a resident priest in Gosport.  The present St Mary's Church opened in about 1855 on the High Street.  St Columba's Church opened in 1953 to serve Catholics on the Bridgemary estate, and there was also a chapel dedicated to St Joseph in the Leesland area.  Lee-on-the-Solent has had a Catholic church since 1918, but the present building dates from 1981.

The Methodist Church of Great Britain documented all the chapels it owned as of 1940 in a statistical return published in 1947.  Within the boundaries of the present borough of Gosport at that time, there were chapels at Lee-on-the-Solent, Stoke Road in Gosport town centre, Priory Road in the Hardway area of the town, Lees Lane at Forton and the National Children's Home in Alverstoke.  All were originally associated with the Wesleyan branch of Methodism.  The first two, opened in 1896 and 1911 respectively, are still in use, and the chapel at Alverstoke was registered until 1984, after which it was converted for secular use.  The chapels at Hardway and Forton have been demolished; they were deregistered for worship in 1989 and 1990 respectively.  A new Methodist church was built on the Bridgemary estate in 1956.

For a large part of the 20th century, Baptist worshippers in Gosport had a choice of three chapels: at Victoria Road (built in 1852 to replace a nearby chapel of 1811), Hardway (1860) and Stoke Road (1910, replacing a nearby tin tabernacle used since 1883).  None of these remain in use.  The Hardway church was deregistered in 1991 and is now occupied by a different congregation; Victoria Road closed in 1999 and amalgamated with Stoke Road; and the Stoke Road building itself was sold in 2011 when the congregation moved into an 18th-century building at the Royal Clarence Yard.  Another Baptist church had opened in the Brockhurst area by 1937 and is still in use with the name Freedom Church.

The Congregational Church and the Presbyterian Church of England came together in 1972 to form a new denomination, the United Reformed Church.  Gosport had one church belonging to each denomination, so from 1972 until 2017 there were two United Reformed churches in the borough.  Both were modern buildings—Bury Road Congregational Church was built in 1957 and St Columba's Presbyterian Church opened a year earlier in the Elson area—but the Congregational church could trace its roots back to 1794, when a chapel opened in the town centre. This was destroyed by bombing in World War II.  Bury Road United Reformed Church closed in May 2017 and the congregation joined St Columba's Church.

Salvation Army halls registered in South Street in 1927, Park Street in 1934 and Forton Road in 1942 all went out of use in October 1950 in favour of new premises elsewhere on Forton Road, which were in turn replaced by the present place of worship called Crossways Hall in 1965.

Religious affiliation
According to the 2011 United Kingdom census, 82,622 lived in the borough of Gosport.  Of these, 58.84% identified themselves as Christian, 0.55% were Muslim, 0.24% were Buddhist, 0.23% were Hindu, 0.05% were Sikh, 0.04% were Jewish, 0.52% followed another religion, 32.82% claimed no religious affiliation and 6.72% did not state their religion.  The proportion of people in the borough who followed no religion was higher than the figure in England as a whole (24.74%); adherence to Christianity was similar (in 2011 59.38% of people were Christian); and Islam, Judaism, Hinduism, Sikhism and Buddhism all had a lower following than in the country overall (at census date 5.02% of people were Muslim, 1.52% were Hindu, 0.79% were Sikh, 0.49% were Jewish and 0.45% were Buddhist).

Administration

Anglican churches
All Anglican churches in the borough are part of the Anglican Diocese of Portsmouth, which is based at Portsmouth Cathedral.  The diocese has seven deaneries plus the cathedral's own separate deanery.  The Gosport Deanery is responsible for all the borough's parish churches: Holy Trinity and Christ Church in Gosport town centre, St John the Evangelist at Forton, St Thomas the Apostle at Elson, the three churches in Alverstoke parish (St Faith, St Francis and St Mary), St Mary the Virgin at Rowner, St Matthew at Bridgemary and St Faith at Lee-on-the-Solent.

Roman Catholic churches
The Catholic churches in Bridgemary, Gosport town and Lee-on-the-Solent are part of the Roman Catholic Diocese of Portsmouth, whose seat is the Cathedral of St John the Evangelist in Portsmouth.  All are in the Solent Pastoral Area of Deanery 5.  The parish of Gosport includes the churches of St Mary in the town centre and St Columba on the Bridgemary estate, and covers the whole of the contiguous urban area.  The parish of Stubbington and Lee-on-the-Solent covers those two villages and is served by the Church of the Immaculate Conception in Stubbington (in the Borough of Fareham) and St John the Evangelist's Church in Lee-on-the-Solent.

Other denominations
The borough's three Methodist churches—at Bridgemary, Gosport and Lee-on-the-Solent—are part of the 23-church East Solent and Downs Methodist Circuit.  Gosport Waterfront Baptist Church and the Freedom Church at Brockhurst belong to the Southern Counties Baptist Association.  Solent Evangelical Church is a member of the Fellowship of Independent Evangelical Churches (FIEC), a pastoral and administrative network of about 500 churches with an evangelical outlook,  Gosport Spiritualist Church belongs to the Spiritualists' National Union and is within the organisation's Southern District, which covers Hampshire, the Isle of Wight, Dorset and Wiltshire.

Listed status

One church in the borough is Grade I-listed, one has Grade II* status and four are listed at Grade II.  As of February 2001, there were 148 listed buildings in the borough of Gosport: 2 with Grade I status, 10 listed at Grade II* and 136 with Grade II status.

Current places of worship

Former places of worship

Notes

References

Bibliography

 (Available online in 14 parts; Guide to abbreviations on page 6)

Gosport
Gosport
Gosport
Gosport, Places of worship
Places of worship